Kolhan University is a university located at Chaibasa in West Singhbhum district in the state of Jharkhand, India.

Colleges 
Its jurisdiction extends over 3 districts - Seraikhela kharsawan,East Singhbhum, West Singhbhum .

Affiliated Colleges
A.J.K. College, Asanboni, Jamshedpur
 B.D.S Mahila College, Ghatsila
GIIT Professional College, Jamshedpur  
 J. K. S. College, Jamshedpur
 J. K. M. College of Management Science And Commerce, Salboni
 Karim City College (CPE Status by UGC), Jamshedpur
Mrs KMPM Vocational College, Jamshedpur
Noamundi College, Noamundi 
 Patamada College Jalla
 St. Augustin College, Manoharpur
 X.I.T.E Gamharia Seraikela Kharsawan
 B.A College of Engineering, Jamshedpur
Maryland Institute of Tech & Management, Jamshedpur
 R.V.S Engineering College
Ashu Kisku Memorial & Rabi Kisku Teachers' Training Institute, Chandil 
 DBMS College Of Education, Kadma, Jamshedpur
Institute for Education, Seraikela Kharsawan 
Jamini Kalyani Mahato College of Management Science Commerce (B.Ed for Women), Salboni
Jamini Kanta B.Ed College, Salboni 
Madhusudan Mahto Teachers Training College, Chakradharpur
Rambha College of Education, Gitilata, Tata-Hata Main Road, Jamshedpur
Swami Vivekanand College of Education, Salboni 
 Avadh Dental College, Jamshedpur
MGM Medical College, Jamshedpur
College of Nursing, Tata Main Hospital, Jamshedpur

Constituent Colleges
 Bari Memorial College, Jashedpur
 Baharagora College, Baharagora
 Degree College, Jagannathpur
 Degree College, Majhgaon
 Degree College, Manoharpur
 Ghatsila College, Ghatsila
 G.C. Jain Commerce  College, Chaibasa
 Jamshedpur Co-operative College, Jamshedpur
 Jamshedpur Co-operative Law College, Jamshedpur
 Jamshedpur Worker's College, Jamshedpur
 Jamshedpur Women's College (CPE Status by UGC), Jamshedpur
 J.L.N. College, Chakradharpur
 K.S. College, Saraikela
 Lal Bahadur Shastri Memorial college, Jamshedpur
 Mahila College, Chaibasa
 Model Mahila College, Kharsawan
 Model Mahavidyalaya,Seraikela-kharswan
 Singhbhum College, Chandil 
 Tata College, Chaibasa
 The Graduate School College for Women's, Jamshedpur

References

 
Educational institutions established in 2009
2009 establishments in Jharkhand
State universities in Jharkhand